The 5th V Chart Awards (第五届音悦V榜年度盛典) is a music awards hosted by YinYueTai on April 8, 2017 at Studio City, Macau. The emcee for the award were Bowie Tsang and Tao Guo.

Shortlisted Criteria 
1. The "data-based category" award nominees are artists who released an official MV in between January 1, 2017 to December 31, 2017 and the artist must be ranked in the chart throughout the whole year.

2. "The Most Popular Artists" series of shortlisted nominees are the top 30 artists in the TOP100 list in all five regions.

3. "Artist Award" series nominees are artists who released music-related work(s) in between January 2017 to December 31, 2017. In addition to the results of the MV chart, the awards will be based on a combination of criteria: the standard of the released album, participation in offline activities, performances, film and television, hosting and the results that accompanies.

4. "Composition Category" award nominees are artists who released an official MV from January 1, 2017 to December 31, 2017 and the artist must have the most #1 wins in the chart throughout the whole year. "MV Awards" are based on MV production standards, word of mouth, shooting, conception, production and list of achievements to determine the winning entries.

5. "Album of The Year" is determined according to the annual album sales data ranking on the Yin Yue Shopping Mall 2017. Shortlisted nominees are the top 10 albums on the data ranking.

Personnel

Host 

YinYueTai

Official Broadcasting Site 

StarTV YinYueTai

Data provider 

YinYueTai Mobile App, YinYueTai PC App, YinYueTai Official Website, Baidu

Interworking Partners 

Billboard, Gaon Charts

Collaboration Partners 

Hunan Broadcasting System, Dragon TV, Sohu TV, KpopStars, Baidu, Miaopai by MeituPic and more.

Voting 
On February 24, nominees for the "Favourite Artist of the Year" were announced. On March 7, the first phase of the "Favourite Artist of the Year" series of polls began. A complete list of the winners was published on the official website on the following day after the award ceremony ended.

Winners and nominees 
Awards in white are major awards.

Performances

Controversies 
The award night falls in conjunction with EXO's five year anniversary. Due to time restraints, EXO only performed two out of the initially planned four songs which brought displeasure to the crowds. At the last 20 minutes of voting for the "Most Popular Artist Of The Night" award, girl group ATF had an abrupt spike of votes, turning the tables on EXO which caused much disorder among the audience present.

References 

China V Chart
2017 music awards
2017 in Macau
Events in Macau
V Chart Awards
April 2017 events in China